Luke Jones (born 2 April 1991) is an Australian rugby union footballer. His regular playing position is either lock or flanker. He represents Racing 92 in the French Top 14 competition, having previously played for the Melbourne Rebels and the Western Force in Super Rugby.

Playing history
Jones represented the Australian Schoolboys in both 2008 and 2009. He was a Schoolboys' captain in 2009, and named to play in a test against New Zealand in Brisbane. He also captained NSW Schools in 2009 at the Australian National Championships. He was selected to tour the UK with the Australian Schoolboys in late 2009, and selected again to play Ireland. Jones then returned to Australia to train with the Western Force in Perth. He had signed with the Force while at St Pius X College in Sydney, to become the first forward in Australian rugby to sign a full-time professional contract while still at school.

Jones had a busy 2010. He made his Super Rugby debut in Wellington against the Hurricanes; he hadn't yet turned 19 when he came off the bench to help Force captain Nathan Sharpe lock the scrum in the competition's second round. At the 2010 JWC in Argentina he scored one of Australia's nine tries to help the Australia wallop Scotland 58–13 in a pool match. And he helped Sydney Uni win its club competition.

In March 2010 it was announced Jones would leave the Force to transfer to the Melbourne Rebels ready for the 2011 Super Rugby season. In May 2011 he made his Rebels debut against the Cheetahs in South Africa. In June he received the 'Rebel Rising Player of the Year' award, and competed for Australia in the JWC in Italy. His JWC teammates included SPX alumni and flanker Michael Hooper (Brumbies from 2010), and prop Paul Alo-Emile (Rebels from 2012).

Jones began his 2012 Super Rugby season at number 6 (blindside flanker) in the Rebels season opener against the Waratahs. He continued with the Rebels in 2013 and 2014.

In 2013, Jones re-signed with the Rebels until the end of the 2016 Super Rugby season.

On 12 May 2020, Jones return to France to join Top 14 rivals Racing 92 ahead of the 2020-21 season.

On 18 July 2022, Jones returned home to Australia, signing with the Queensland Reds.

Personal life
Jones currently studies a Bachelor of Commerce at Deakin University.

Super Rugby statistics

References

External links
Rebels profile

Living people
1991 births
Australian rugby union players
Australia international rugby union players
Rugby union locks
Rugby union flankers
Rugby union players from Sydney
Melbourne Rebels players
Western Force players
Melbourne Rising players
Union Bordeaux Bègles players
Australian expatriate rugby union players
Australian expatriate sportspeople in France
Expatriate rugby union players in France
Racing 92 players
People educated at St Pius X College, Sydney
Queensland Reds players